Pierre-Marie Pory-Papy, born on 3 May 1805 in Saint-Pierre, Martinique and died on 27 January 1874 in Versailles, Seine-et-Oise, was a French lawyer and politician. He was deputy of Martinique from 1848 to 1849 and from 1871 to 1874.

Biography 
Pierre-Marie Pory-Papy was the son of a free man of colour from Martinique and Antoinette, a freedwoman. He was born before his mother received her freedom, but his name is not found in the register of births until 30 March 1806, because his parents waited until she was free to register his birth.

In 1832, he left for France and was shipwrecked on the Spanish coast. Despite this, he arrived there and settled in Aix-en-Provence, where he obtained his first baccalaureate in August 1833, his second in August 1834. He continued his studies at the Faculty of Law in Paris. He obtained a law degree in July 1835, returned to Martinique and was called to the bar in St-Pierre, the first man of colour to become a lawyer in Martinique.

He also wrote poetry which he contributed to the Revue des Colonies.

Elected offices 

Pierre-Marie Pory-Papy was successively elected municipal councillor, deputy mayor, mayor of Saint-Pierre and deputy of Martinique. Though both abolitionists, Pory-Papy was politically distinct from Cyrille Bissette, and aligned instead with Victor Schoelcher.

Pierre-Marie Pory-Papy was corresponding member of the Abolitionist Society, looking for a position as a solicitor when the French Revolution of 1848 occurred. On 30 March 1848, governor Rostoland issued a decree dissolving the municipal council of St-Pierre. On the same day he appointed Hervé as provisional mayor and Pory-Papy as provisional deputy, in charge of the police, alongside two others. The decree of 10 May 1848 confirmed them in their posts, following elections which took place on 2 and 3 May 1848. He was also appointed councillor at the Court of Appeal of Martinique by decree of the provisional government of the French Republic, dated 3 May 1848.

Pierre-Marie Pory-Papy is an important figure in the history of Martinique for his role in support of the enslaved population during the anti-slavery insurrection of May 1848 in Saint-Pierre.

On 24 May 1848, the day after the application of the 1848 decree on the abolition of slavery, Pierre-Marie Pory-Papy was elected by the municipal council as mayor of Saint-Pierre, a position he would hold until 30 August 1848. He was twice elected deputy of Martinique, for the first time on 9 August 1848, losing his seat on 26 May 1849. During this term, he "earned the special emnity of the proprietors on Martinique by agitating for the break-up of the large estates and a distribution of land to landless."

He was successfully reelected on 8 February 1871 and served until 27 January 1874, when he died. He was buried in Versailles, in the Montreuil cemetery.

In literature 

 Pory-Papy appears as part of the events of 22 May described to the narrator of the novel Texaco, by Patrick Chamoiseau
 He also appears in Marie-Reine de Jaham's Le sang du volcan.

See also 
Monique Palcy's article: Pierre Marie Pory-Papy in Notre Bulletin (Association Martiniquaise de Recherche de l'Histoire des Familles) No. 27, July 2013.

References 

1805 births
1874 deaths
People from Saint-Pierre, Martinique
Martiniquais politicians
Republican Union (France) politicians
Members of the 1848 Constituent Assembly
Members of the National Assembly (1871)
French abolitionists
19th-century French lawyers
Martiniquais lawyers